Idia lubricalis, the glossy black idia, is a litter moth of the family Erebidae. The species was first described by Carl Geyer in 1832. It is found from Canada south to Florida and Texas in deciduous forests.

Idia occidentalis was formerly considered a subspecies of Idia lubricalis.

The wingspan is 24–36 mm. Adults are on wing from May to September. There are multiple generations per year in the south.

The larvae feed on various fungi and lichens. They probably feed on other organic matter like rotting wood and grass on forest floor as well.

Subspecies
Idia lubricalis partitalis
Idia lubricalis cobeta

References

Herminiinae
Moths of North America
Moths described in 1832